A Family Affair is a 1937 American comedy film. It was the first of 16 movies now known as the Andy Hardy series, though Andy Hardy, played by Mickey Rooney, did not become the main character in the series until a few more installments had been made. The movie features Lionel Barrymore as Judge Hardy and Spring Byington as his wife, who are Andy's parents. Barrymore and Byington were replaced in their roles by Lewis Stone and Fay Holden in the subsequent films.

In this film, the highly respected judge has to deal with family and political problems. It was based on the 1928 play Skidding by Aurania Rouverol.

Plot summary

Judge James K. Hardy (Lionel Barrymore) hopes to be re-elected, but his campaign is put in jeopardy by his opposition to a wasteful public works program.
Hardy and his family—wife Emily, adult daughters Joan and Marion, and teenage son Andy (Mickey Rooney)—live in Carvel, a small, fictional midwestern American town.

Spurned contractor Hoyt Wells and newspaper publisher Frank Redmond swear to block Hardy's re-election campaign.  Frank agrees to use his paper, The Carvel Star, to publish disparaging stories about the family.

That evening Judge Hardy's daughter Marion returns home from college. Older daughter Joan Hardy Martin moves in as well, after a secret separation from her husband Bill. The family throws a party for returning Marion.  At the party they are warned by a Star gossip columnist that only negative stories are going to be published about the family. Later that night teenaged Andy Hardy reluctantly takes his childhood sweetheart Polly to a party, and is pleasantly surprised by what a beautiful woman she has grown into. Marion has found love in Wayne Trent, an engineer who has come to town to work on the aqueduct.  Facing the possibility of her boyfriend losing his job, she questions her father's decision to block the construction.

Meanwhile, Joan confesses to her father that she and Bill are separated after she went to a roadhouse with another man.  Although the encounter was innocent, Bill was enraged, and they soon separated.

The Carvel Star publishes an article stating that people are calling for Judge Hardy's impeachment.  Judge Hardy attempts to bring contempt of court proceeding against the Star.

Cast
 Lionel Barrymore as Judge James K. Hardy
 Cecilia Parker as Marion Hardy
 Eric Linden as Wayne Trent III
 Mickey Rooney as Andy Hardy
 Charley Grapewin as Frank Redmond
 Spring Byington as Mrs. Emily Hardy
 Julie Haydon as Joan Hardy Martin
 Sara Haden as Aunt Milly Forrest
 Allen Vincent as William Booth Martin
 Margaret Marquis as Polly Benedict
 Selmer Jackson as Hoyt Wells

Original play

The movie was based on the play Skidding by Aurania Rouverol.

Production
The film was made in the wake of the success of Ah, Wilderness! (1936). Many of the same cast from that movie returned.

Reception
The film made a profit of $153,000.

See also
 Lionel Barrymore filmography

References

External links

 
 
 
 
 A Family Affair at Andy Hardy Films
 

1937 films
American black-and-white films
1937 comedy-drama films
American films based on plays
Films directed by George B. Seitz
Metro-Goldwyn-Mayer films
American comedy-drama films
1930s American films
1930s English-language films